Detect and avoid (DAA) is a set of technologies designed to avoid interference between a given emitter and the wireless environment. Its need was generated by the Ultra-wideband (UWB) standard that uses a fairly large spectrum to emit its pulses.

According to the U.S. Federal Communications Commission (FCC), UWB can use from 3.1 to 10.6 GHz. That means it could interfere with WiMAX, 3G or 4G networks.

External links 
 Detect & Avoid – Short page on DAA
 Detect and Avoid Technology: For Ultra Wideband (UWB) Spectrum Usage – whitepaper presenting an experience with DAA.

Wireless networking